Micromidia is a genus of dragonflies in the family Austrocorduliidae.
They are small to medium-sized dragonflies, coloured black or metallic green with pale markings, and endemic to eastern Australia.

Species
The genus Micromidia includes the following species:

Micromidia atrifrons  – forest mosquitohawk
Micromidia convergens  – early mosquitohawk
Micromidia rodericki  – Thursday Island mosquitohawk

Note about family
There are differing views as to the family that Micromidia best belongs to:
 It is considered to be part of the Austrocorduliidae family at the Australian Faunal Directory
 It is considered to be part of the Synthemistidae family in the World Odonata List at the Slater Museum of Natural History
 It is considered to be part of the Corduliidae family at Wikispecies

See also
 List of Odonata species of Australia

References

Austrocorduliidae
Anisoptera genera
Odonata of Australia
Endemic fauna of Australia
Taxa named by Frederic Charles Fraser
Insects described in 1959